Crisp is a surname. Notable people with the surname include:

 Benjamin Crisp (1808–1901), New Zealand carrier, temperance reformer and character.
 Bob Crisp (1911–1994), South African cricketer.
 Charles Frederick Crisp (1845–1896), a U.S. Representative from Georgia.
 Charles R. Crisp (1870–1937), U.S. politician.
 Clement Crisp (1926–2022), a British dance critic. 
 Covelli Loyce "Coco" Crisp (1979– ), baseball center fielder.
 Donald Crisp (1882–1974), English film actor.
 Finlay Crisp (1917–1984), Australian academic and political scientist.
 Fiona Crisp (born 1966), British photographer.
 Frank Crisp (1843–1919), English lawyer and microscopist.
 George Crisp (1911–1982), Welsh footballer who played for Coventry City.
 Hank Crisp (1896–1970), American college sports coach.
 Harold Crisp (1874–1942), Australian judge
 Henry Crisp (by 1505–75), English landowner and politician. 
 Hope Crisp (1884–1950), English tennis player, first winner of Wimbledon mixed doubles.
 Jack Crisp (born 1993), Australian rules football player at the Brisbane Lions.
 Jack Crisp (footballer) (1896–1939), English footballer
 James Crisp (born 1982), British Paralympic swimmer.
 James Crisp (cricketer) (1927–2005), Welsh cricketer
 Joy Crisp, American planetary geologist specializing in Mars geology.
 Mary Dent Crisp, American feminist and Republican Party official
 Michael Douglas Crisp (born 1950), Australian botanist
 N. J. Crisp (1923–2005), British television writer, dramatist and novelist.
 Nathaniel Crisp (1762–1819), British prankster and baptizer.
 Nicholas Crisp (c. 1599–1666), English Royalist and Member of Parliament
 Nigel Crisp, Baron Crisp (born 1952), British civil servant.
 Norman Crisp (1923–2005), English television writer.
 Quentin Crisp (1908–1999), English writer, artist's model, actor.
 Quentin S. Crisp (born 1972), British SF writer.
 Ruth Crisp (1918–2007), crossword compiler.
 Samuel Crisp (1707–1783), English dramatist
 Stephen Crisp (1628–1692), English Quaker activist and prolific writer.
 Terry Crisp (1943– ), Canadian ice hockey centerman.
 Thomas Crisp (1876–1917), English skipper, won VC.
 Tobias Crisp (1600–1643), English clergyman and reputed antinomian.
 William Crisp (1842–1910), English missionary priest who worked in South Africa.

See also:
 Crisp (disambiguation)

English-language surnames